The Estonian Age of Awakening is a period in history where Estonians came to acknowledge themselves as a nation deserving the right to govern themselves. This period is considered to begin in the 1850s with greater rights being granted to commoners and to end with the declaration of the Republic of Estonia in 1918. The term is sometimes also applied to the period around 1987 and 1988.

History 

Although Estonian national consciousness spread in the course of the 19th century, some degree of ethnic awareness in the literate middle class preceded this development. By the 18th century the self-denomination eestlane (Estonian) along with the older maarahvas (country folk) spread among Estonians in the then provinces of Estonia and Livonia of the Russian Empire. The Bible was translated in 1739, and the number of books and brochures published in Estonian increased from 18 in the 1750s to 54 in the 1790s. By the end of the 18th century more than half of the country's rural adult male population was able to read, and the literacy rate in urban areas was already significantly higher. The first university-educated intellectuals identifying themselves as Estonians, including Friedrich Robert Faehlmann (1798–1850), Kristjan Jaak Peterson (1801–1822) and Friedrich Reinhold Kreutzwald (1803–1882), came to prominence in the 1820s. The ruling elite had remained predominantly German in language and culture since the conquest of the early 13th century. Garlieb Merkel (1769–1850), a Baltic German Estophile, was the first author to treat the Estonians explicitly as a nationality equal to others; he became a source of inspiration for the Estonian national movement, modelled on Baltic German cultural world before the middle of the 19th century. However, in the middle of the century the Estonians, with such leaders as Carl Robert Jakobson (1841–1882), Jakob Hurt (1839–1907) and Johann Voldemar Jannsen (1819–1890), became more ambitious in their political demands and started leaning towards the Finns as a successful model of national movement and, to some extent, the neighbouring Young Latvian national movement. Significant accomplishments were the publication of the national epic, Kalevipoeg, in 1862, and the organization of the first national song festival in 1869. By the end of the 1860s the Estonians became unwilling to remain reconciled with German cultural and political hegemony. Before the attempts at Russification in the 1880s–1890s their view of Imperial Russia remained positive.

In 1881 seventeen Estonian societies, in a memorandum inspired by Carl Robert Jakobson, called upon Emperor Alexander III of Russia for the introduction of zemstvo institutions (which had already existed in most parts of the Empire), with equal representation for Estonians and Baltic Germans and administrative unification of the ethnic Estonian areas. Postimees, the first Estonian daily, began appearing in 1891. According to the 1897 census, the Estonians had the second highest literacy rate in the Russian Empire after the Finns in the Grand Duchy of Finland (96.1% of the Estonian-speaking population of the Baltic Provinces 10 years and older, roughly equally for males and females). The cities became Estonicized quickly, and in 1897 ethnic Estonians comprised two-thirds of the total Estonian urban population.

In response to a period of Russification initiated by the Russian empire in the 1880s, Estonian nationalism took on even more political tones, with intellectuals calling for greater autonomy. As the Russian Revolution of 1905 swept through Estonia, the Estonians called for freedom of the press and assembly, for universal franchise, and for national autonomy. Estonian gains were minimal, but the tense stability that prevailed between 1905 and 1917 allowed Estonians to advance the aspiration of national statehood. Following the February Revolution of 1917 Estonian lands were for the first time united in one administrative unit, the autonomous Governorate of Estonia. After the Bolshevik takeover of power in Russia in 1917, and the following successful German invasion further into Soviet Russia, Estonia declared itself an independent nation on 24 February 1918.

See also 

 Estophilia, a Baltic German movement that led to and promoted the Estonian national awakening
 Finnish Nationalism
 The First Latvian National Awakening
 Lithuanian national awakening

References

Further reading 
 Petersoo, Pille (2007). Reconsidering otherness: Constructing Estonian identity. Nations and Nationalism 13.1, 117–133.
 Raun, Toivo U. (2003). Nineteenth- and early twentieth-century Estonian nationalism revisited. Nations and Nationalism 9.1, 129–147.
 Raun, Toivo U. (1986). The Latvian and Estonian national movements, 1860–1914. The Slavonic and East European Review 64.1, 66–80.
 Piirimäe, Helmut. Historical heritage: the relations between Estonia and her Nordic neighbors. In M. Lauristin et al. (eds.), Return to the Western world: Cultural and political perspectives on the Estonian post-communist transition. Tartu: Tartu University Press, 1997. 
Nodel, Emanuel. Estonia: Nation on the Anvil. N.Y.: Bookman Associates, 1963.
Raun, Toivo U. Estonia and the Estonians. 2nd ed. Stanford, CA: Hoover Institution Press, 1991.

External links 
 The History of the Baltic States – The Estonian Awakening
 1850–1918. National awakening

Estonian culture
Education in Estonia
Russian Empire
Estonian nationalism